Filip Cederqvist (born August 23, 2000) is a Swedish professional ice hockey winger currently playing with the Rochester Americans in the American Hockey League (AHL) as a prospect for the Buffalo Sabres of the National Hockey League (NHL). He was drafted 143rd overall by the Sabres in the 2019 NHL Entry Draft.

Playing career
Cederqvist made his Swedish Hockey League (SHL) debut for the Växjö Lakers during the 2018–19 SHL season where he played 33 regular season games, scoring 4 goals and 4 assists for 8 points.

In his second season in the SHL with the Växjö Lakers in 2019–20, Cederqvist was unable to build on his rookie season, collecting just 1 goal and 1 assist in 30 games, while enduring loan stints in the Allsvenskan with Almtuna IS and BIK Karlskoga.

Out of contract with Växjö in the off-season, Cederqvist left the SHL club, securing a one-year contract with Allsvenskan club, Tingsryds AIF, on 5 June 2020.

Following a successful season with Tingsryds, Cederqvist returned to the SHL, agreeing to a one-year contract with Djurgårdens IF on 19 April 2021. In the following 2021–22 season, Cederqvist enjoyed a breakout season, recording career highs with 14 goals, 18 assists and 32 points in 49 regular season games.

Unable to prevent Djurgårdens IF suffering relegation to the Allsvenskan, Cederqvist was signed by draft club, the Buffalo Sabres, in agreeing to a two-year entry-level contract on 14 June 2022.

Career statistics

References

External links

2000 births
Living people
Almtuna IS players
BIK Karlskoga players
Buffalo Sabres draft picks
Djurgårdens IF Hockey players
HV71 players
People from Skara Municipality
Rochester Americans players
Tingsryds AIF players
Swedish ice hockey forwards
Växjö Lakers players
Sportspeople from Västra Götaland County